Teatro Bradesco is a theatre in São Paulo, Brazil.

Theatres in São Paulo